The Roman Catholic Diocese of Antsirabe is a Latin suffragan diocese in the Ecclesiastical province of Antananarivo (one of five in Madagascar; in the national capital), yet depends on the missionary Roman Congregation for the Evangelization of Peoples.

Its cathedral episcopal see is the (Marian) Cathédrale Notre-Dame-de-la-Salette, in the city of Antsirabe, Antananarivo Province.

Statistics 
As per 2014, it pastorally served 892,713 Catholics (45.4% of 1,967,703 total) on 16,000 km2 in 29 parishes and 2 missions with 125 priests (64 diocesan, 61 religious), 519 lay religious (198 brothers, 321 sisters) and 74 seminarians.

History 
 Established on May 15, 1913 as Apostolic Prefecture of Betafo, on Malagassy territory split off from the then Apostolic Vicariate of Central Madagascar.
 Promoted on August 24, 1918 as Apostolic Vicariate of Betafo, hence entitled to a titular bishop. 
 Renamed on January 10, 1921 as Apostolic Vicariate of Antsirabe after its new see.
 Promoted on September 14, 1955 as Diocese of Antsirabe.

Bishops

Ordinaries 
(Roman Rite, mostly members of missionary Latin congregations)

Apostolic Prefect of Betafó  
 Father François-Joseph Dantin, Missionaries of Our Lady of LaSalette (M.S.) (born France) (1913.06.24 – 1918.08.24 see below)

Apostolic Vicars of Betafo 
 François-Joseph Dantin, M.S. (see above 1918.08.24 – 1921.01.10 see below), Titular Bishop of Satala in Armenia (1918.08.24 – death 1941.07.05)

Apostolic Vicars of Antsirabe 
 François-Joseph Dantin, M.S. (see above 1921.01.10 – death 1941.07.05)
 Édouard Rostaing, M.S. (born France) (1942.02.24 – death 1946.05.18), Titular Bishop of Curium (1942.02.24 – 1946.05.18)
 Joseph-Paul Futy, M.S. (born France) (1947.02.13 – death 1955.03), Titular Bishop of Aspendus (1947.02.13 – 1956.08.12); previously Apostolic Prefect of Morondava (Madagascar) (1938 – 1947.02.13)

Suffragan Bishops of Antsirabe 
 Claude Rolland, M.S. (born France) (1955.12.19 – death 1973.10.15)
 Jean-Maria Rakotondrasoa, M.S. (first native incumbent) (1974.02.28 – retired 1989.06.19), died 2002
 Philibert Randriambololona, Society of Jesus (S.J.) (1989.06.19 – 1992.12.17), succeeding as previous Coadjutor Bishop of Antsirabé (1988.09.01 – 1989.06.19); later Metropolitan Archbishop of Fianarantsoa (Madagascar) (1992.12.17 – retired 2002.10.01), died 2018
 Félix Ramananarivo, M.S. (1994.11.11 – retired 2009.11.13), died 2013
 Philippe Ranaivomanana (2009.11.13 – death 2022.09.06), previously Bishop of Ihosy (Madagascar) (1999.01.02 – 2009.11.14)

Coadjutor Bishop
 Philibert Randriambololona, S.J. (1988-1989)

Other priest of this diocese who became bishop
Désiré Tsarahazana, appointed Bishop of Fenoarivo Atsinanana in 2000; future Cardinal

See also 
 List of Roman Catholic dioceses in Madagascar
 Roman Catholicism in Madagascar

References

Sources and external links 
 GCatholic.org
 Catholic Hierarchy

Roman Catholic dioceses in Madagascar
Christian organizations established in 1913
Roman Catholic dioceses and prelatures established in the 20th century
1913 establishments in Madagascar
Roman Catholic Ecclesiastical Province of Antananarivo